Andrei Sergeyevich Govorov (born 13 October 1984) is a former Russian professional football player.

Club career
He played eight seasons in the Russian Football National League for seven different clubs.

Honours
 Russian Cup finalist: 2005.

External links
 

1984 births
Footballers from Moscow
Living people
Russian footballers
Association football midfielders
PFC CSKA Moscow players
FC Mostransgaz Gazoprovod players
FC Baltika Kaliningrad players
FC Khimki players
FC Asmaral Moscow players
FC Ural Yekaterinburg players
FC Zvezda Irkutsk players
FC Torpedo Moscow players
FC Nizhny Novgorod (2007) players
FC Shinnik Yaroslavl players
FC Sokol Saratov players
FC Olimp-Dolgoprudny players